Hepatus is a genus of crabs in the family Aethridae, containing seven extant species, plus some fossil species:
 Hepatus chiliensis H. Milne-Edwards, 1837
 Hepatus epheliticus (Linnaeus, 1763)
 Hepatus gronovii Holthuis, 1959
 Hepatus kossmanni Neumann, 1878
 Hepatus lineatus Rathbun, 1898
 Hepatus pudibundus (Herbst, 1785)
 Hepatus scaber Holthuis, 1959

Both H. chiliensis and H. lineatus are also known as fossils. The other fossil species include:
Hepatus bottomsi Blow, 2003
Hepatus lineatus Rathbun, 1898
Hepatus nodosus Collins & Morris, 1976
Hepatus praecox Collins et al., 1996
Hepatus spinimarginatus Feldmann et al., 2005

References

Crabs